Military Surface Deployment and Distribution Command (SDDC) is the Army Service Component Command of the U.S. Transportation Command (USTRANSCOM) and is a major subordinate command to Army Materiel Command (AMC). This relationship links USTRANSCOM's Joint Deployment and Distribution Enterprise and AMC's Materiel Enterprise. The command also partners with the commercial transportation industry as the coordinating link between DOD surface transportation requirements and the capability industry provides.

History

Organizational development

Military Surface Deployment and Distribution Command (SDDC) traces its organizational lineage to the Army's former Office of the Chief of Transportation, established 31 July 1942. Fourteen years later, the Defense Department established a separate agency to carry out traffic management functions. On 1 May 1956, SDDCs original mandate began when the Secretary of Defense designated the Secretary of the Army as the single manager for military traffic within the United States.

Military Traffic Management Agency/US Army Transportation Terminal Command

On 1 July 1956, the Army established the Military Traffic Management Agency (MTMA) to carry out those single-manager functions. Originally, MTMA did not operate military ocean terminals, a function held by the U.S. Army Transportation Terminal Command (a Transportation Corps component).

The original MTMA did not feature port commands but did include five regional offices: eastern (Pittsburgh, PA), western (Oakland, CA), central (St. Louis, MO), southwestern (Dallas, TX), and southeastern (Atlanta, GA). This arrangement essentially lasted until 1965. Only the Oakland headquarters remained the same after that time. MTMA and then DTMS called the field offices "traffic regions."

Defense Traffic Management Service

MTMA lasted only five and one half years. Then, as part of his overall DOD restructuring, Secretary of Defense Robert McNamara transferred the organization to the newly established Defense Supply Agency (DSA). On 1 January 1962, he re-designated MTMA as the Defense Traffic Management Service (DTMS). The United States Army Materiel Command then took over the military ocean terminals. However, DOD and congressional concerns over duplication in military logistics soon led to further reorganizations. After a detailed reexamination of the Defense Transportation System, McNamara designated the Secretary of the Army as the single manager for military traffic, land transportation, and common-user ocean terminals on 19 November 1964.

Military Traffic Management and Terminal Service

To execute this centralized management concept, a joint service planning staff formed up to establish an agency, the Military Traffic Management and Terminal Service (MTMTS). DOD then formally activated MTMTS as a jointly staffed Army major command on 15 February 1965. MTMTS assumed all responsibilities assigned to the Defense Traffic Management Service and the terminal operations functions of the U.S. Army Supply and Maintenance Command (a component of the Army Materiel Command). With the approval and publication of its single-manager charter on 24 June 1965, MTMTS joined the Military Air Transport Service (now Air Mobility Command) and the Military Sea Transport Service (now Military Sealift Command) in providing complete transportation services to the Department of Defense.

The formation of the Military Traffic Management and Terminal Service resulted in tremendous change in the command's organization. Since MTMTS now operated military ocean terminals, it focused its area command structure on ports. Upon the command's formation the former eastern traffic region headquarters moved to Brooklyn Army Terminal in Brooklyn, NY, and became Eastern Area. Western Area (formerly a traffic region) headquarters remained at Oakland, CA. MTMTS abolished the southwestern and southeastern field offices. For two years, however, MTMTS retained its central area command in St. Louis, MO.

To streamline operations further, the command then disestablished that headquarters in early 1967 and transferred its functions to Eastern Area. MTMS maintained its Eastern Area Headquarters at Brooklyn, N.Y. until September 1975 when it moved Bayonne N.J.

In 1966 the Transportation Engineering Agency, Fort Eustis, VA, the Army's only activity with traffic and transportability engineering expertise became a major component of MTMTS.

MTMTS provided support for the Vietnam War through cargo operations at its Military Ocean Terminals at Oakland CA, (MOTBA), Bayonne, New Jersey (MOTBY) and Sunny Point, NC (MOTSU) as well as commercial ports. In the earlier years of the war MTMTS shipped soldiers by surface from its Western Area (primarily Oakland). By 1967 as troops rotated to Vietnam in small groups or individually, fewer soldiers went by surface; most were airlifted to the theater.

As a means of easing serious congestion and ship delay, MTMTS in 1966 initiated a practice of sending full shiploads to single ports of debarkation in theater whenever possible. It continued this practice throughout the war.

Military Traffic Management Command

On 31 July 1974, MTMTS was re-designated as the Military Traffic Management Command (MTMC) to make its title more readily identifiable with its mission.

United States Transportation Command

On 1 October 1988, MTMC, along with the Military Sealift Command and the Military Airlift Command officially became components of the United States Transportation Command (TRANSCOM). Created on 18 April 1987, TRANSCOM began official operations on 1 October 1987, as DOD's single unified transportation command.

TRANSCOM's mission was to integrate global air, land and sea transportation in support of national security objectives. MTMC, MSC and AMC remained as major commands of their parent services and have continued to perform service-unique missions under the direction of their military departments. On 1992-02-14 DOD gave TRANSCOM control of service-operated transportation in both peace and war.

The first Gulf war

The millions of tons of cargo and thousands of troops moved to support Operation DESERT SHIELD/DESERT STORM marked the largest test of the military's logistical capability since the World War II Normandy invasion. During the Gulf War, MTMC personnel successfully managed the movement of 85% of the unit equipment shipped to Saudi Arabia. They operated out of 33 ports worldwide and loaded more than 945,000 pieces of equipment equaling 6.5 million measurement tons (7.4 million m³) onto 564 ships bound for Saudi Arabia. At the peak of operations, MTMC activated 12 transportation units, 225 volunteers, and 73 Individual Mobilization Augmentees from the Reserve components to support DESERT SHIELD missions. Under the Special Middle East Shipping Agreements, MTMC booked 37,000 forty-foot commercial containers with sustainment supplies aboard commercial liners bound for Southwest Asia.

After the Gulf war: organizational changes

The Gulf War resulted in changes for MTMC. In 1991, MTMC re-designated its Transportation Terminal Command Far East as MTMC Pacific and moved it from Korea to Hawaii. Headquarters then assigned MTMC Europe as a subordinate command of MTMC Eastern Area in July 1992. This arrangement meshed with HQMTMC's relationships with Western Area and MTMC Pacific. The Command's February 1993 reorganization created an organization that provided improved quality service and optimum strategic deployability of America's forces in support of national defense.

The Commands directorates of international traffic, inland traffic, passenger traffic, personal property and safety and security were centralized into a single Operations Directorate. The reorganization also combined personnel and logistics into a single directorate.

MTMC supported several contingency operations in the 1990s. Among them were to Operation Restore Hope, Somalia in 1993, Operation Support Hope, Rwanda, in 1994, Operation Uphold Democracy Haiti in 1994, Operation Vigilant Warrior in Damman, Saudi Arabia, 1994–95 and Operation Joint Endeavor, Bosnia-Herzegovina in 1996.

In general, the Cold War's end meant continuous change for MTMC. Even before the Berlin Wall fell, Congress had established the Base Realignment and Closing Commission (BRAC). Throughout the 1990s, this group shuttered growing numbers of well-established but less-used bases around the country. MTMC survived the first few BRAC cycles (1988, 1991, 1993), but not the 1995 round of proposals. At that time the Defense Department recommended closing the Oakland and Bayonne military ocean terminals. BRAC accepted its recommendations, which meant abolishing MTMC's Eastern and Western Area Commands. According to plan, MTMC would close down those ocean terminals by 2001.

To replace its two area headquarters, HQMTMC planned to establish a single continental United States (CONUS) command. HQMTMC formed a selection team, which evaluated a large variety of sites. In early 1997, Secretary of the Army Togo D. West reviewed the site team recommendations and decided on Fort Eustis, Virginia as the single area command's headquarters.

The loss of the area commands meant gain in other areas. As a result of the recommendations by its Organizational Excellence team, HQMTMC made MTMC Europe (since 1992 a component of Eastern Area) and MTMC Pacific (a component of Western Area) separate commands in late 1996.

In an effort to make its organizations more recognizable as regular Army units, MTMC re-designated its port units on 1 October 1997. The previous four-digit designations changed to three digits and the major and medium port commands changed to groups, battalions, and companies. For example, MTMC Europe became the 598th Transportation Group (Terminal) and MTMC Pacific became the 599th Transportation Group (Terminal).

Relocations & reorganizations

On 15 October 1997, MTMC established the Deployment Support Command (DSC) at Fort Eustis. Its Eastern and Western Area Commands were consolidated into the DSC. On 30 September 31 September 1999, MTMC closed its Military Ocean Terminals at Bayonne and Oakland.

The Commands headquarters moved the following year. For the 35 years MTMC headquarters operated out of the Nassif Building in Falls Church, VA. From May through October 2000, the Headquarters relocated to the Hoffman II Building in Alexandria, VA.

Continuing with its streamlining operations, MTMC began in 2000 to standardize the size and organization of its groups, battalions and companies worldwide. Prior to these changes, MTMCs transportation battalions varied in strength from 19 to 84 persons.
During the following year MTMC reorganized into a single operating headquarters, split-based in Alexandria VA and Fort Eustis VA. The Command concurrently deactivated its Deployment Support Command and stood up its Operations Center in November 2001.

During 2001 and throughout 2002, MTMC mobilized Reserve Transportation units and organized Deployment Support Teams as part of its support for the Global War on Terrorism.

Throughout the 1990s the Command worked continuously to reengineer its Household Goods Moving Program. In November 2002 it began developing a new program titled, Families First to be the revised DOD Household Goods Program. Families Firsts objective is threefold (1) to improve the liability/claims process; (2) to improve carrier performance through performance based acquisitions and (3) to implement an integrated move management system.

Military Surface Deployment and Distribution Command

With TRANSCOM's designation as the DOD's Joint Distribution Process Owner in the fall of 2003 and as a result of MTMC's changed missions to meet the demands of the "Global War on Terror", the Command changed its name officially on 1 January 2004 to Military Surface Deployment and Distribution Command.

Organization 
The Command comprises the following components (as of July 2019):
 Command Headquarters, Scott AFB
 Transportation Engineering Agency, Scott AFB
 Deployment Support Command, Birmingham, Alabama
 595th Transportation Brigade, Camp Arifjan, Kuwait
 831st Transportation Battalion, Manama, Bahrain
 840th Transportation Battalion, Ash Shuaiba, Kuwait
 596th Transportation Brigade, Military Ocean Terminal Sunny Point
 833rd Transportation Battalion, Joint Base Lewis–McChord
 834th Transportation Terminal Battalion, Concord, California
 597th Transportation Brigade, Joint Base Langley–Eustis, Virginia
 832nd Transportation Battalion, Joint Base Langley–Eustis
 841st Transportation Battalion, Charleston, South Carolina
 842nd Transportation Battalion, Beaumont, Texas
 598th Transportation Brigade, Sembach Kaserne, Germany
 838th Transportation Battalion, Kaiserslautern, Germany
 839th Transportation Battalion, Livorno, Italy
 599th Transportation Brigade, Wheeler Army Airfield, Hawaii
 835th Transportation Battalion, Okinawa, Japan
 836th Transportation Battalion, Yokohama, Japan
 837th Transportation Battalion, Busan, South Korea

See also
Comparable organizations
Military Sealift Command (U.S. Navy)
Air Mobility Command (U.S. Air Force)

References

Further reading

External links
 

1965 establishments in the United States
United States Army Service Component Commands
Military units and formations in Illinois
St. Clair County, Illinois
Military units and formations established in 1965